The 1950 Heathrow BEA Vickers Viking crash occurred on 31 October 1950 when a Vickers Viking operated by British European Airways (BEA) crashed at London Airport in heavy fog. The aircraft was on a scheduled flight between Paris and London's Northolt airport and 28 of the 30 passengers and crew on board were killed.

Accident
At 6.39 pm on the evening of the accident, a Vickers VC.1 Viking twin-engined airliner of BEA (registered G-AHPN and named Lord St Vincent) took off from Le Bourget Airport in Paris on a scheduled flight to Northolt airport, London with a crew of four and 26 passengers. On receiving this information, the pilot announced that he would attempt to land at London Airport instead. Although visibility at London Airport was only , it had the facilities for a Ground-controlled approach (GCA, i.e. a "talkdown" by radar operators). The pilot told ATC that if he could not safely land at London Airport, he would divert to Blackbushe Airport in Hampshire or Manston Airport in Kent.

Shortly after reaching this point the pilot announced over the radio, I am overshooting (aborting the landing attempt and carrying out a go-around), but a few seconds later the aircraft struck the runway and skidded along it for  before regaining the air. With both propellers damaged by the initial contact with the ground, it finally crashed approximately  further along the runway, the starboard wing being torn off and the aircraft bursting into flames as it came to rest next to a store of drain-pipes. The thick fog hindered rescue attempts and it took the fire and rescue teams 16 to 17 minutes to find the crashed aircraft. Of the 30 people on board there were only two survivors, a stewardess and a passenger; both had been seated near the tail.

Investigation
A public inquiry was set up to investigate the accident, chaired by Sir Walter Monckton; while a more general investigation of the relative responsibilities of pilots and ground control with respect to landings in poor weather conditions was to be led by Lord Brabazon of Tara, the aviation pioneer and former Minister of Transport.

Lord Brabazon reported first, in February 1951, making a number of recommendations regarding the lighting of airfields in poor weather conditions, the measurement of visibility and the setting of minimum weather conditions for landing. It was also noted that BEA's operating manual was confusing as to whether the decision heights stated were compulsory or advisory only, and Monckton recommended that aircraft be prohibited from landing where the visibility was significantly below the minimum conditions set by the operator. The recommendations of both Brazabon and Monckton were all implemented.

References

"28 are killed in British Air Crash". Lodi News-Sentinel, Lodi, California, 31 October 1950, p. 7.
Andrews, C.F. and E.B Morgan. Vickers Aircraft since 1908. London:Putnam, 1988. .
"ASN Aircraft accident Vickers 610 Viking 1B G-AHPN London Airport". Aviation Safety Network, 2002. Retrieved 20 July 2010.
"Civil Aviation". Flight, 2 March 1951, p. 252.
"Civil Aviation News: Unlucky Fortnight". Flight, 9 November 1950, p. 411.
"Civil Aviation News:The Brazabon Report". Flight, 23 February 1951, p. 235.
"Lessons from an Accident:Findings of the Court Investigation of the Viking G-AHPN". Flight, 19 October 1951, pp. 518, 519.

 

Aviation accidents and incidents in 1950
Accidents and incidents involving the Vickers VC.1 Viking
Vickers Viking
1950 in London
BEA Vickers Viking
1950 disasters in the United Kingdom
October 1950 events in the United Kingdom
20th century in Middlesex
Disasters in Middlesex
History of the London Borough of Hillingdon
Airliner accidents and incidents in the United Kingdom